Dolné Obdokovce is a village and municipality in the Nitra District in western central Slovakia, in the Nitra Region.

History
In historical records the village was first mentioned in 1228.

Geography
The village lies at an altitude of 197 metres and covers an area of 10.187 km². It has a population 1188 people (cenzus 2011).

Ethnicity
The village is 667 (56%) Magyar, 417 (35%) Slovak and 99 (9%) others.

Facilities
The village has a public library and football pitch.

Genealogical resources

The records for genealogical research are available at the state archive "Statny Archiv in Nitra, Slovakia"

 Roman Catholic church records (births/marriages/deaths): 1751-1911 (parish B)

See also
 List of municipalities and towns in Slovakia

External links

https://web.archive.org/web/20080111223415/http://www.statistics.sk/mosmis/eng/run.html
Surnames of living people in Dolne Obdokovce

Villages and municipalities in Nitra District
Hungarian communities in Slovakia